Wyoming Hurricane is a 1944 American Western film directed by William Berke and written by Fred Myton. The film stars Russell Hayden, Dub Taylor, Bob Wills, Tommy Duncan, Leon McAuliffe and Alma Carroll. The film was released on April 20, 1944, by Columbia Pictures.

Plot

Cast          
Russell Hayden as Lucky Saunders
Dub Taylor as Cannonball
Bob Wills as Bob
Tommy Duncan as Musician 
Leon McAuliffe as Steel Guitar Player 
Al Stricklin as Musician
Alma Carroll as Gayle Foster
Tris Coffin as Steve Kirby
Joel Friedkin as Dan Foster
Paul Sutton as Bart Cassidy
Benny Potti as Joe Slade
Robert Kortman as Vic Dawson
Hal Price as Sheriff
Steve Clark as Jed
Frank McCarroll as Henchman
Carol Henry as Henchman

References

External links
 

1944 films
1940s English-language films
American Western (genre) films
1944 Western (genre) films
Columbia Pictures films
Films directed by William A. Berke
American black-and-white films
1940s American films